Ranorex Studio is a GUI test automation framework provided by Ranorex GmbH, a software development company. The framework is used for the testing of desktop, web-based and mobile applications.

Overview 
Ranorex Studio supports development of automated test modules using standard programming languages such as C# and VB.NET.

Main features
 GUI object recognition, filtering GUI elements using the company's proprietary technology RanoreXPath. 
 Object-based record and replay, using Ranorex Recorder, which records the user's interaction with a desktop or web-based application and creates user-maintainable scripts that can be edited with the Ranorex Studio action editor. The recorded actions are available as both C# and VB.NET code. Record and replay is supported on mobile devices for actions such as key presses and touch gestures.

Supported technologies
 Windows desktop client applications such as .NET, WPF, Win32, VB6, Java, MFC, Embarcadero Delphi.
 Web technologies such as HTML, HTML5, JavaScript Frameworks, Ajax, Silverlight, Flash, and Flex.
 Cross-browser testing for Chrome, Safari, Microsoft Edge, Internet Explorer, and Firefox
 Mobile Apps
 native iOS apps
 native Android apps

System environment
Ranorex Studio runs on Microsoft Windows and Windows Server. As of version 10.2, Ranorex Studio supports Windows 11

Reception 

In a 2018 review by Forrester Research of 15 omnichannel functional test automation tools including Ranorex Studio 8.1.1, Ranorex was ranked as having the weakest current offering and the second-weakest strategy, scoring 1.65 of 5 and 1.5 of 5 respectively.

In 2019, Ranorex was one of 10 vendors evaluated in the Gartner Magic Quadrant for Software Test Automation. Gartner identified Ranorex as a "niche player".

See also 

 Test automation
 GUI software testing
 Web testing
 List of web testing tools
 List of GUI testing tools

References

External links
 

Graphical user interface testing
Software testing tools